Ampara Airport, also known Gal-Oya Airport, is a domestic airport in Gal-Oya in southeastern Sri Lanka. It is also a military airbase known as Sri Lanka Air Force Ampara or SLAF Ampara.

History
An air strip in Gal Oya near Uhana was built in the 1950s by the Gal Oya Development Board. A Sri Lanka Air Force detachment from SLAF Katunayake moved onto the air strip on 19 December 1989. The Regimental Training Center opened at the base in July 2000.

Airlines and destinations

References

External links
 Sri Lanka Air Force Ampara

Airports in Sri Lanka
Transport buildings and structures in Ampara District
Sri Lanka Air Force bases
Transport in Eastern Province, Sri Lanka